Alvin Tan may refer to:
 Alvin Tan (director)
 Alvin Tan (blogger)
 Alvin Tan (politician)
 Alvin Tan (artist)